PNT may refer to:

 Postnormal times, in post-normal science
 Prime number theorem
 National Peasants' Party, a Romanian political party
 National Executive Committee for Space-Based Positioning, Navigation and Timing
 National Workers' Party (Spain), a small far-right party in Spain
 Pacific Northwest Trail, a hiking trail 
 Palestinian National Theatre
 para-Nitrotoluene or mononitrotoluene
 Pontic Greek's ISO 639-3 code
 Positioning, navigation and timing